The Stellihorn is a mountain of the Swiss Pennine Alps, located west of St. Niklaus in the canton of Valais. It lies north of the Barrhorn, on the range between the Turtmanntal and the Mattertal.

The Stellihorn has two summits: the Inners Stellihorn (3,410 m) and the Üssers Stellihorn (3,405 m).

References

External links
 Stellihorn on Hikr

Mountains of the Alps
Alpine three-thousanders
Mountains of Switzerland
Mountains of Valais